Rupa-Rupa District is one of six districts of the province Leoncio Prado in Peru.

References